Warea is a community in the west of Taranaki, in the North Island of New Zealand. It is located on State Highway 45, 26 kilometres north of Ōpunake. The local Pūniho Marare, also known as Tarawainuku Marae, is a traditional meeting ground of the Taranaki Iwi hapū of Ngā Māhanga. It includes the Kaimirumiru and Ko Pauna te Tipuna meeting houses.

During the First Taranaki War in April 1860, government troops crossed the Hangatahua River and attacked Māori settlements and a mill around Warea. On 28 April 1865 during Second Taranaki War, Warea was the location of a government fortification, Warea Redoubt. The redoubt was abandoned in early 1868.

References

South Taranaki District
Populated places in Taranaki